Vasily Makarovich Shukshin (25 July 1929 – 2 October 1974) was a Soviet Russian writer, actor, screenwriter and film director from the Altai region who specialized in rural themes. A prominent member of the Village Prose movement, he began writing short stories in his early teenage years and later transition to acting by his late 20s.

Biography
Vasiliy Makarovich Shukshin was born on 25 July 1929 to a peasant family of assimilated Moksha Mordvin origin in the village of Srostki near Biysk in Siberian Krai, Soviet Union (now in Altai Krai, Russia). In 1933, his father, Makar Leontievich Shukshin, was arrested and executed on the charges of participating in an "anti-kolkhoz plot" during the Soviet collectivization. He was only rehabilitated 23 years later, in 1956. His mother, Maria Sergeyevna (née Popova), had to look after the survival of the entire family. By 1943 Shukshin had finished seven years of village school and entered an automobile technical school in Biysk. In 1945, after two and a half years at the school, but before finishing, he quit to work in a kolkhoz.

In 1946 Shukshin left his native village and worked as a metal craftsman at several enterprises in the trust Soyuzprommekhanizatsiya: at the turbine plant in Kaluga, at the tractor plant in Vladimir, etc. In 1949, Shukshin was drafted into the Navy. He first served as a sailor in the Baltic Fleet, then a radio operator on the Black Sea. In 1953 he was demobilized due to a stomach ulcer and returned to his native village. Having passed an external exam for high school graduation, he became a teacher of Russian, and later a school principal in Srostki.

In 1954 Shukshin entered the directors' department of the VGIK, studied under Mikhail Romm and Sergei Gerasimov, and graduated in 1960. While studying at VGIK in 1958, Shukshin had his first leading role in Marlen Khutsiyev's film Two Fedors and appeared in the graduation film by Andrei Tarkovsky.

In 1958 Shukhin published his first short story "Two on the cart" in the magazine Smena. His first collection of stories Сельские жители (Village Dwellers) was published in 1963. That same year, he became staff director at the Gorky Film Studio in Moscow. He wrote and directed Живёт такой парень (There Is This Lad). The film premiered in 1965, winning top honours at the All-Union Film Festival in Leningrad and the Golden Lion at the XVI International Film Festival in Venice. Shukshin was decorated with the Order of the Red Banner of Labour (1967), and was designated Distinguished Artist of the RSFSR (1969).

Shukshin's main interest lay in the situation of ordinary, simple people in the present-day Soviet Union. He laced his films both with humor and with a melancholy tone.

Since 1964, he was married to actress Lidiya Fedoseyeva, who also appeared in several of his films. They have a daughter, Mariya (born 1967), who is a TV presenter.

Shukshin died suddenly on 2 October 1974, on the motor ship Dunai, on the Volga river, while filming They Fought for Their Country. He is buried in Novodevichy Cemetery in Moscow.

English translations
I Want to Live, Progress Publishers, 1978.
Snowball Berry Red and Other Stories, Ardis Publishers, 1979.
Short Stories, Raduga Publishers, 1990.
Roubles in Words, Kopeks in Figures, Marion Boyars, 1994.
Stories from a Siberian Village, Northern Illinois University Press, 1996.

Theatre adaptation
Latvian theatre director Alvis Hermanis adapted eight of Shuksin's short stories for stage, in a collaboration with the Theatre of Nations in Moscow,  entitled Shuksin's Stories or Shuksin's Tales.  it is still touring the world, having first being staged in around 2009, and has won several awards. Starring Evgeny Mironov, the play was staged at The Barbican in London in October 2019.

Filmography

1956: The Killers (Short) - Ole Andreson
1957: And Quiet Flows the Don - Minor Role (uncredited)
1958: Two Fedors - Great Fyodor
1959: The Golden Eshelon - Andrey Nizovtsev
1960: A Simple Story - Ivan Lykov
1960: Iz Lebyazhego soobshchayut - Ivlev
1961: Mission1962: Alyonka - Stepan Revan
1962: When the Trees Were Tall - Chairman of the Kolkhoz
1962: Mishka, Seryoga, And Me
1963: We, Two Of Men - Mikhail Gorlov
1964: There Is Such a Lad (director, screenwriter)
1965: What Is The Sea?
1965: Your Son and Brother (director, screenwriter)
1967: The Journalist
1967: The Commissar - The Commandant
1968: Three Days Of Victor Chernyshov - Kravchenko
1968: Men's Talk
1969: Strange People (director, screenwriter) - Nikolay Nikolayevich Larionov
1969: Echoes Of Far Snows
1970: By the Lake - Vasiliy Chernykh
1970: Liberation I: The Fire Bulge - Gen. Konev
1970: Liberation II: Breakthrough - Gen. Konev
1970: Lyubov Yarovaya - Roman Koshkin
1971: Dauria - Vasily Ulybin
1971: Liberation III: Direction of the Main Blow - Gen. Konev
1971: Liberation IV: The Battle of Berlin - Marshall Ivan Stepanovitch Konev
1971: Liberation V: The Last Assault - Marshall Ivan Stepanovitch Konev
1971: Soldier Came From The Front (screenwriter)
1971: Hold On To The Clouds
1972: Happy Go Lucky (director, screenwriter) - Ivan Rastorguyev
1972: Dauriya - Vasili Ulybin
1974: The Red Snowball Tree (director, screenwriter) - Yegor Prokudin
1974: If You Want To Be Happy - Vladimir Fedotov
1974: Fellows (screenwriter)
1975: They Fought for Their Country - Piotr Lopakhin
1976: I Wish to Speak - Feda, dramaturg (final film role)
1977: Call Me To The Light Far (screenwriter)
1988: Yolki-palki (writer)
2004: High Boots'' (writer)

References

External links
 
Vasily Shukshin: Personality and Legend
 О чувашских корнях выдающегося писателя

1929 births
1974 deaths
Mordvin people
People from Altai Krai
Gerasimov Institute of Cinematography alumni
Lenin Prize winners
Russian male film actors
Russian film directors
20th-century Russian screenwriters
20th-century Russian male writers
Male screenwriters
Russian male writers
Soviet male actors
Soviet film directors
Soviet screenwriters
Soviet short story writers
20th-century Russian short story writers
Recipients of the USSR State Prize
Burials at Novodevichy Cemetery
Russian male short story writers